There were many major cities in the Grand Duchy of Lithuania.

Capitals (chronologically)

Voruta (Hypothetical)
Kernavė
Trakai
Vilnius

Centers of voivodeships (since administrational reform)
Lietuvos Brasta
Minskas
Mstislavlis
Naugardukas
Polockas
Raseiniai
Trakai
Vilnius
Vitebskas

Other cities and towns

See also
Grand Duchy of Lithuania
Subdivisions of Lithuania

Former subdivisions of Belarus
Belarus geography-related lists
Former subdivisions of Lithuania
Lithuania geography-related lists
Grand Duchy of Lithuania